New River Trail State Park is a  rail trail and state park located entirely in southwest Virginia, extending from the trail's northeastern terminus in Pulaski to its southern terminus in Galax, with a  spur from Fries Junction on the main trail to Fries.

Designated a National Recreation Trail, the linear park follows  of the New River, which is one of the five oldest rivers in the world.

Headquartered in Foster Falls, roughly a third of the trail distance from Pulaski, the crushed stone multi-use trail was formally created in 1986, when Norfolk Southern Railway donated its discontinued right-of-way to the state of Virginia.

The trail was designated a Millennium Legacy Trail in 1999, for reflecting "the spirit of the nation's states and territories." The  linear park adjoins historic sites including the 19th-century Jackson Ferry Shot Tower, the Draper Mercantile building, two turn-of-the-century hydroelectric dams, remains of the Ivanhoe Blast Furnace, the Ivanhoe Carbide Plant, the Foster Falls Blast Furnace, and the Foster Falls Orphanage, as well as numerous outdoor recreational areas, including Mount Rogers National Recreation Area, and four Department of Game and Inland Fisheries boat launches.

Nearby state parks
The following state parks are within  of New River Trail State Park:
Claytor Lake State Park
Grayson Highlands State Park
New River State Park, North Carolina
Stone Mountain State Park, North Carolina

See also 
Cycling infrastructure
High Bridge Trail State Park
Virginia Capital Trail
Greenbrier River Trail
Virginia Creeper Trail
Fall Line Trail
Washington & Old Dominion Trail

References

External links
Official website

State parks of Virginia
State parks of the Appalachians
Rail trails in Virginia
Parks in Grayson County, Virginia
Parks in Carroll County, Virginia
Parks in Wythe County, Virginia
Parks in Pulaski County, Virginia
National Recreation Trails in Virginia
Long-distance trails in the United States
Protected areas established in 1987
1987 establishments in Virginia
Bike paths in Virginia